Aplonis is a genus of starlings. These are essentially island species of Indonesia and Oceania, although some species' ranges extend to the Malay Peninsula, southern Vietnam and northeastern Queensland. The typical adult Aplonis starling is fairly uniformly plumaged in black, brown or dark green, sometimes with a metallic gloss. The eye ring is often distinctively coloured. Immatures of several species have dark streaked pale underparts.

Several species have restricted ranges, and, like other island endemics, have become endangered or extinct as a result of habitat loss or introduced mammals such as rats.

The following is the list of Aplonis species in taxonomic order:

Metallic starling, Aplonis metallica
Yellow-eyed starling, Aplonis mystacea
Singing starling, Aplonis cantoroides
Tanimbar starling, Aplonis crassa
Atoll starling, Aplonis feadensis
Rennell starling, Aplonis insularis
Long-tailed starling, Aplonis magna
White-eyed starling, Aplonis brunneicapillus
Brown-winged starling, Aplonis grandis
Makira starling, Aplonis dichroa
Rusty-winged starling, Aplonis zelandica
Striated starling, Aplonis striata
Tasman starling, Aplonis fusca (extinct c.1923)
Norfolk starling, Aplonis fusca fusca (extinct c.1923)
Lord Howe starling, Aplonis fusca hulliana (extinct c.1919)
Mountain starling, Aplonis santovestris
Asian glossy starling, Aplonis panayensis
Moluccan starling, Aplonis mysolensis
Short-tailed starling, Aplonis minor
Micronesian starling, Aplonis opaca
Pohnpei starling, Aplonis pelzelni (possibly extinct, c.2000)
Polynesian starling, Aplonis tabuensis
Samoan starling, Aplonis atrifusca
Kosrae starling, Aplonis corvina (extinct, mid-19th century)
Mauke starling, Aplonis mavornata (extinct, mid-19th century)
Rarotonga starling, Aplonis cinerascens
Huahine starling, Aplonis diluvialis (prehistoric)

References

 
Bird genera